Pétillon may refer to:

Places
 Pétillon metro station, Brussels, Belgium
 a hamlet near Fleurbaix, Hauts de France, France

People
 René Pétillon (1945–2018), French satirical and political cartoonist 
 Léon Pétillon (1903–1996), governor-general of Belgian Congo